Nicolas Démoulin (born 22 July 1972) is a French politician of La République En Marche! (LREM) who has been serving as a member of the French National Assembly since the 2017 elections, representing the department of Hérault.

Political career
In parliament, Démoulin serves on the Committee on Economic Affairs. In addition to his committee assignments, he is a member of the French-Malian Parliamentary Friendship Group.

Since October 2018, Démoulin has been serving as one of five deputy chairpersons of the LREM parliamentary group, under the leadership of chairman Gilles Le Gendre.

He is not seeking re-election in the 2022 French legislative election.

Political positions
In July 2019, Démoulin voted in favor of the French ratification of the European Union’s Comprehensive Economic and Trade Agreement (CETA) with Canada.

References

1972 births
Living people
Deputies of the 15th National Assembly of the French Fifth Republic
La République En Marche! politicians